Maddalena Ferat is a 1920 Italian silent film directed by Febo Mari and Roberto Roberti and starring Francesca Bertini. It is an adaptation of Émile Zola's 1868 novel Madeleine Férat.

Cast
 Francesca Bertini 
 Giorgio Bonaiti 
 Achille De Riso 
 Giovanni Gizzi 
 Mario Parpagnoli 
 Giuseppe Pierozzi 
 Bianca Renieri 
 Antonietta Zanone

References

Bibliography
 Anna Gural & Robert Singer. Zola and Film: Essays in the Art of Adaptation. McFarland, 2005.

External links

1920 films
1920s Italian-language films
Films directed by Roberto Roberti
Italian silent feature films
Films based on French novels
Films based on works by Émile Zola
Italian black-and-white films
Silent drama films